José Manuel Yáñez Meira de Vasconcellos (born 9 March 1959 in Santiago de Chile), better known as Joe Vasconcellos, is a Chilean singer/songwriter and composer of Latin rock, with influences of Latin American fusion and Brazilian popular music. He is the son of a Brazilian diplomat father and a Chilean mother.

Early in his career he worked as a singer in the prestigious band Congreso (1980-1984) before having a successful solo career in the 1990s and 2000s.

Career

Early Career in Congreso (1980-1983) 
Born in Chile, but lived in Italy until 20 years, before returning to his mother's homeland. Promptly went to work as a singer in bars in Viña del Mar where he met Sergio "Tilo" González, Patricio Gonzalez, Hugo Pirovic, and Ernesto Holman, from the group Congreso, with whom work from 1980 to 1983 and recorded two albums, and composing also one of the most emblematic songs of the band: Hijo del sol luminoso (Son of the Shining Sun), including in the legendary album Viaje por la cresta del mundo (1981), the first of two albums he recorded with that band. The second Ha llegado carta (1983), had only Vasconcellos for registration, as in 1984 the musician left the project to go to meet other challenges in Brazil. His tenure in the group was, for the Chilean of great pride.

Consolidation as soloist (1997-2002) 
In 1997 Vasconcellos launches Transformación, a record that followed the line of Toque but with a little more sophistication and less batucadas. Their songs sounded on radio were more attached to the Toque, for example, "Preemergencia" and "Funa". As for the quality of their albums, Vasconcellos has failed to their studio recordings strength of their live performances. Maybe that was the starting point for Vivo, the bestselling album in his career. The album was recorded during two concerts events in Teatro Providencia in the winter of 1999, and collected all musician hits, including "Hijo del sol luminoso", "Huellas" and a studio version for "La joya del Pacífico" recorded as a central theme for the TV series "Cerro Alegre" by Canal 13. This album grew positively bond with his audience, ultimately causing his invitation to 2000 Viña del Mar International Song Festival which was a resounding success. Joe then became one of the nation's premier artists and high artistic quality. Also that year he sold just over 130,000 copies.
The success allowed the musician to grow in independence. He built a recording studio and grew their production office to give space also to work of other artists, such as Santo Barrio and La Floripondio they recorded their albums there in the new study Batuke. The difficult and overwhelming aspect of fame left the musician with no possibility of designing new songs for some time. Later work on the soundtrack of the Chilean film Taxi para tres, which was greatly appreciated by the single "Volante or Maleta". Also in the film, but this time in animation, Vasconcellos wrote several songs for the soundtrack of Ogu and Mampato in Rapa Nui (which was Chile's submission to the Academy Award for Best Foreign Language Film in 2002), in collaboration with the musician Easter Island Myth Manutomtoma.

Discography

With Congreso

 1981 - Viaje por la cresta del mundo
 1982 - Ha Llegado Carta

As Soloist

 1989 - Esto es sólo una canción
 1992 - Verde cerca
 1995 - Toque (album)
 1997 - Transformación
 2003 - En paz
 2005 - Banzai
 2007 - Destino
 2014 - Llamadas

Live albums and compilations 
 1999 - Vivo
 2001 - Taxi para tres
 2002 - Ogu and Mampato in Rapa Nui
 2003 - Al mal tiempo buena cara 
 2007 - Joe Vasconcellos en tour 
 2008 - Destino (Álbum + DVD)
 2009 - Mágico - Grandes Éxitos
 2009 - Mágico - El Recital (DVD)

References 

1959 births
Living people
20th-century Chilean male singers
Chilean male guitarists
21st-century Chilean male singers
Chilean singer-songwriters
Chilean people of Brazilian descent
20th-century Chilean male artists